San Francesco del Prato is a Gothic-style, Roman Catholic church, now deconsecrated, located on Piazzale San Francesco #4 in central Parma, Italy.

History
Founded by the Franciscan order, the first church on the site was built 1227-1238. Their adjacent school once housed the theologian Bartolomeo Mastri da Meldola. The nave had two aisles, separated by columns. The cupola pinnacles were painted by Michele Anselmi.  The apse has an aged fresco depicting Christ Pantocrator attributed to Bernardino Grossi and Jacopo Loschi.

The Oratorio della Concezione (Oratory of the Immaculate Conception) was designed by  Bernardino Zaccagni and Giovanni Francesco Ferrari d'Agrate in the 16th century. It was decorated with frescos by Michelangelo Anselmi and Francesco Rondani in 1532-1533.

Until it was looted by Napoleonic troops in 1803, the main altar had a painting of The Conception of Our Lady, a masterpiece of  Girolamo Mazzola Bedoli,  In 1816, the painting was restored, but is now displayed in the Galleria Nazionale di Parma. In the oratory, there is a copy . Most of the other paintings once in the church have either been destroyed, dispersed, or are now in either the church of Santissima Trinità Vecchia, or in the Galleria Nazionale di Parma.

After the suppression of the rites in 1800, the church became a city jail.  Cells were in the nave, and this led to a replacement of the windows, and covering of the frescos. The bell-tower held the isolation cell for special prisoners. The church is undergoing restoration, and plans to be reconsecrated in 2021.

References

Parma
Francesco
Parma